See Kusaila for the 7th-century Berber leader.

Aksel is a masculine name, used predominantly throughout Scandinavia, a variant  of Axel.

People with the name include:
Aksel Agerby (1889–1942), Danish composer, organist, and music administrator
Aksel Airo (1898–1985), Finnish lieutenant general and main strategic planner
Aksel Andersen (1912–1977), Danish-American organist and composer and organ professor and examinist
Aksel Frederik Andersen (1891–1972), Danish mathematician
Aksel Arstal (1855–1940), Norwegian theologist, schoolteacher and geographer
Aksel Bender Madsen (1916–2000), Danish furniture designer
Aksel Berg (1893–1979), Soviet scientist and Navy Admiral (in Engineering)
Aksel Berget Skjølsvik (born 1987), Norwegian professional football player
Aksel Bonde (1918–1996), Danish rower who competed in the 1948 Summer Olympics
Aksel Brehm (born 1889), Estonian politician
Aksel C. Wiin-Nielsen (1924–2010), Danish professor of meteorology at University of Copenhagen
Aksel Duun (1921–1987), Danish sprint canoeist who competed in the late 1950s
Aksel Fossen (1919–2009), Norwegian politician for the Labour Party
Aksel Gresvig (1876–1958), Norwegian track cyclist, sports administrator and businessman
Aksel Gürcan Demirtaş (born 1973), Turkish track and field athlete
Aksel Hagen (born 1953), Norwegian politician and member of the Storting
Aksel Hennie (born 1975), Norwegian actor, director and writer
Aksel Hansen (1853–1933), Danish sculptor
Kaj Aksel Hansen (1917–1987), Danish footballer and manager
Aksel V. Johannesen (born 1972), Faroese lawyer and politician
Aksel Kallas (1890–1922), Estonian politician
Aksel Kankaanranta (born 1998), Finnish singer who would've represented Finland in the Eurovision Song Contest 2020
Aksel Kuuse (1913–1942), Estonian track and field athlete
Aksel Larsen (1897–1972), Danish politician who was chairman of the Communist Party of Denmark
Aksel Lund Svindal (born 1982), Norwegian alpine skier
Aksel Lydersen (1919–1995), Norwegian engineer and professor of chemical engineering
Aksel Madsen (1899–1988), Danish long-distance runner
Aksel Magdahl (born 1979), Norwegian navigator
Aksel Mark (1913–2014), Estonian politician, journalist, newspaper editor and agronomist
Aksel Mikkelsen (1849–1929), Danish educator
Aksel Nielsen (1901–1984), Danish-born American philanthropist, founder of the Mortgage Banking Association's School of Mortgage Banking
Aksel Nõmmela (born 1994), Estonian cyclist
Aksel Orav (1929–2003), Estonian actor
Aksel Herman Rüütli (1893–1976), Estonian politician
Aksel Sørensen (1891–1955), Danish gymnast who competed in the 1912 Summer Olympics
Aksel Sandemose (1899–1965), novelist, born in Nykøbing, Mors Island, Denmark
Aksel Schiøtz (1906–1975), Danish tenor and Lieder singer
Aksel Vartanyan (born 1938), Soviet and Russian journalist and sports historian
Aksel C. Wiin-Nielsen (1924–2010), Danish meteorologist and professor of meteorology
Aksel Zachariassen (1898–1987), Norwegian politician, newspaper editor, secretary and writer

References

Danish masculine given names
Estonian masculine given names
Faroese masculine given names
Norwegian masculine given names